Koolen is a lake of Chukotsky District, Chukotka Autonomous Okrug, Russia.
Its name originated in the Chukchi word Koolёn, a fault or deep chasm.

Geography
Koolen is a long and narrow lake located in the Inan Range area of the Chukotka Mountains, at the eastern end of the Chukotka Peninsula, 13 km from the coast of the Chukchi Sea. The highest point near the lake is Mount Yttyvyt, a  mountain.

Koolen has a tectonic origin. Its water has a very weak content in minerals and is very transparent. The lake has a deep-blue tint and in the areas of greater depths the blue is so dark that it looks almost black. The area around the lake is uninhabited, the nearest town is Lavrentiya, located 44 km to the southwest.

See also
List of lakes of Russia

References

External links
Picture of the lake
Koolen metamorphic complex, NE Russia

Koolen
Chukotka Mountains